Dasylirion serratifolium, or the sandpaper sotol, is a plant species in the family Asparagaceae, native to the Mexican states of Hidalgo and Oaxaca. It is often cultivation as an ornamental in other places, including in Europe.

References

serratifolium
Flora of Mexico
Flora of Hidalgo (state)
Flora of Oaxaca
Taxa named by Joseph Gerhard Zuccarini